Eros is an unincorporated community in southwestern Marion County, Arkansas, United States. The community is located on Arkansas Highway 125, south of Pyatt.

Education 
Public education is available from the Ozark Mountain School District that includes Bruno–Pyatt High School.

On July 1, 2004, the former Bruno-Pyatt School District consolidated into the Ozark Mountain School District.

References

Unincorporated communities in Marion County, Arkansas
Unincorporated communities in Arkansas